Sausage fest may refer to:

"Sausage fest", a derisive term for a male gender imbalance
"Sausage Fest", an episode of Robot Chicken

See also
Sausage market, a German-American Wurst mart
Sausage Party, a 2016 comedy film